Phragmataecia irrorata is a species of moth of the family Cossidae. It is found in Zimbabwe, South Africa, Namibia, Botswana, Mozambique, Zambia and Malawi.

References

Moths described in 1910
Phragmataecia
Moths of Africa
Lepidoptera of Namibia
Lepidoptera of Mozambique
Lepidoptera of Malawi
Lepidoptera of Zambia
Lepidoptera of Zimbabwe